Mina the Hollower is an upcoming action-adventure game developed and published by Yacht Club Games. It is planned for release in December 2023 for Microsoft Windows, macOS, and Linux. The game revolves around Mina, a skilled inventor and "Hollower" who travels to Tenebrous Isle to discover why the Spark Generators she invented to power the island have gone out.

Gameplay 

The game is in a 3/4 isometric perspective, with Mina able to attack in four directions using her whip, or burrow underground to traverse short distances quickly as well as cross gaps. Tunneling makes her invincible while she is performing the action. Mina is also able to use sidearms like a hatchet and dagger, although she can only hold one at a time. Trinkets can also be equipped to provide permanent navigational abilities.

Story

Setting 
The game takes place in a Gothic Horror-inspired world of anthropomorphic animals. The main setting is Tenebrous Isle, whose only major city is Ossex. One of the levels shown is Nox's Bayou, a poisonous swamp containing one of the generators.

Plot 
The game's main character is Mina, a genius inventor and mouse who has created advances in Spark Technology. She is also a Hollower, a member of a guild dedicated to studying the earth, and can move extremely fast while underground using a technique known as Hollowing. She wields a whip, Nightstar, as a weapon. She travels to Tenebrous Isle, home of Baron Lionel, a wealthy lion who has been Mina's patron in installing her technology on the isle, leading to rapid development. Standing in her way is Thorne, a bat who was the former head of Lionel's guard before he and his Shock Troopers betrayed the Baron and destroyed the generators.

Development 
Mina the Hollower originally began as a side project by Yacht Club Games employee Alec Faulkner to hone his coding and artistic capabilities, and was not originally intended for commercial release. Development on the solo affair, now under the name Gothic, caught the attention of Yacht Club management, who viewed the title as a favourable pairing to the studio's flagship Shovel Knight series. A Kickstarter campaign was launched to support development, which raised over USD$1.2 million from 21,439 backers; including other sources of crowdfunding, the game raised over USD$1.4 million for the studio.

Mina the Hollower was designed to mimic the visual appearance of a Game Boy Color title. This stylistic decision was made while still a side project for Faulkner, inspired by a slew of Game Boy games he had been playing in his personal time. In an attempt to pay homage to early portable gaming and remain as authentic as possible to the original Game Boy hardware, Mina abides by the technical limitations of the Game Boy, containing no 3D assets and limiting pixel design to four colours per tile. The lone exception to this philosophy is the game's widescreen resolution.

The developers' interest in scary stories and horror games, as well as creating the darker-in-tone Specter of Torment DLC for Shovel Knight, is what inspired them to create an entirely darker game. The gameplay and story draws influences from such games as Castlevania, The Legend of Zelda: Link’s Awakening, and Bloodborne.

While the music in-game is primarily composed by Jake "Virt" Kaufman, the game also features Yuzo Koshiro as a guest composer for two tracks.

Reception 
Will Greenwald of PCMag called the game ambitious in a preview, comparing it to "Castlevania meets Zelda" and describing the presentation as "charming". Stating that he was "very impressed" with the game's demo, he called the mechanic of diving into the ground "unusual", but stated that he quickly got used to it as a natural part of gameplay. Thomas Whitehead of Nintendo Life stated that he was ultimately "left excited" by the game after playing the demo, calling it an "excellent return" for the studio after making numerous spin-offs. Alex Stadnik of Game Informer called it a "gorgeous homage".

References 

Upcoming video games scheduled for 2023
Action-adventure games
Kickstarter-funded video games
Linux games
MacOS games
Retro-style video games
Single-player video games
Video games about mice and rats
Video games developed in the United States
Video games featuring female protagonists
Video games set on fictional islands
Windows games
Yacht Club Games games